The Pont National was a swing bridge across the river Penfeld in Brest, France. It opened in 1861 and linked rue de Siam to Recouvrance, near the Tour Tanguy. It was destroyed by Allied bombardment in 1944 and was replaced by the Pont de Recouvrance in the 1950s.

Buildings and structures in Brest, France